Jabili is a 2001 Indian Telugu-language romantic drama film directed by S. V. Krishna Reddy. The film stars Dileep (starred in Repallelo Radha) and Rekha Vedavyas.

Cast 
Dileep as Hemanth 
Rekha as Lavanya
Chandra Mohan
Chalapati Rao
Tanikella Bharani
Brahmanandam
Jogi Naidu
Mallikharjuna Rao
Sana
Jayalalita
M. S. Narayana
Sudha

Soundtrack 
The music is composed by S. V. Krishna Reddy himself. Lyrics by Suddala Ashok Teja, Veturi and Bhuvana Chandra.
"Ganga Yamuna Godari" - KK, K. S. Chitra
"Chiguraku Evaro" - P. Unnikrishnan, K. S. Chitra 
"Vayasu Talupu Teriche - P. Unnikrishnan 
"Achamaina Telugu Bajji" - Udit Narayan, Mahalakshmi
"Jollu Jolly College" - Shankar Mahadevan 
"Pada Pada Nee" - Hariharan, Snehapanth

Release 
Despite being complete, the film had trouble finding buyers.

Reception 
Gudipoodi Srihari of The Hindu opined that "The film goes haywire due to poor story and dialogues [...] A poor show unexpected of Krishna Reddy, where even the music too lacks the usual vigor and sense". Jeevi of Idlebrain.com said that "The story starts in the interval and drags till the climax. The only console in the film is occasional parallel comedy track by Brahmanandam. This film has no soul". Mithun Verma of Full Hyderabad wrote that "S V Krishna Reddy gives us some inspiring dialogues such as "Pulla Reddy: from a small laddu to big shop". His mind, though, wanders very often - but not to worry, it's appears too weak now to go very far".

References

2001 films